Jirakit Kuariyakul (also known as Toptap, born 1 May 1994) is a Thai actor. He is known for his main role as Tul in GMMTV's Room Alone 401-410 (2014) and supporting roles as Type in 2gether: The Series, Still 2gether and 2gether: The Movie and Ai in Tonhon Chonlatee (2020-2021).

Early life and education 
Jirakit was born in Nan Province, Thailand. He graduated with a bachelor's degree in business administration, major in marketing at Mahidol University International College. He was an exchange student for a year in America for an AFS program.

Career 
He started his acting career in 2014 by playing a support role in Love Sick: The Series (2014–2015). In the same year, he got the main role of Tul in Room Alone 401-410 (2014). He went on to play main and support roles in several television series such as U-Prince Series (2016–2017), SOTUS: The Series (2016–2017), Senior Secret Love: Puppy Honey 2 (2017) and Water Boyy: The Series (2017).

He recently played the role of PP in 3 Will Be Free (2019) and Type in 2gether: The Series, Still 2gether (2020) and 2gether: The Movie (2021).

After his successful role in 2gether: The Series, Still 2gether and 2gether: The Movie'' with his on-screen partner, Chinnarat Siripongchawalit (Mike), their tandem returned in Tonhon Chonlatee as Ai and Ni, a secret couple and a roommate of Tonhon (played by Supakorn Sriphotong (Pod)).

Filmography

Television

Personal life 
Aside from his acting career, Jirakit owns two restaurants namely Fuku Intown and 3Brothers Chicken Rice, which he co-owns with fellow actors Perawat Sangpotirat and Khoo Pei-Cong.

References

External links 
 
 

1994 births
Living people
Jirakit Kuariyakul
Jirakit Kuariyakul
Jirakit Kuariyakul
Jirakit Kuariyakul
Jirakit Kuariyakul